Agglethorpe is a hamlet in the Richmondshire district of North Yorkshire, England, it lies in northern Coverdale, approximately  south west of Leyburn.

History 
In 1086 it was recorded as Aculestorp in the Domesday Book.

In 1870–72 John Marius Wilson's Imperial Gazetteer of England and Wales described Agglethorpe as:"A joint township with Coverham, in Coverham parish, W. R. Yorkshire".The Grade II listed building of Agglethorpe Hall was built in the 17th century.

Governance 
The hamlet lies within the Richmond (Yorks) parliamentary constituency, which is under the control of the Conservative Party. The current Member of Parliament, since the 2015 general election, is Rishi Sunak. Agglethorpe also lies within the Middleham ward of Richmondshire District Council. It forms part of the civil parish of Coverham with Agglethorpe, along with Coverham.

References

External links
 
 

Hamlets in North Yorkshire
Coverdale (dale)